The Dalhousie Obelisk is a memorial obelisk in the Civic District of Singapore, located on the north bank of the Singapore River in the Downtown Core, within the Central Area in Singapore's central business district.

The obelisk is situated at Empress Place, near the Asian Civilisations Museum and the Victoria Theatre and Concert Hall, and the Anderson Bridge near the mouth of the Singapore River.

Architecture
The Dalhousie Obelisk is an important architectural element in Empress Place but somewhat neglected and obscured by trees. It was designed by John Turnbull Thomson when he was a Government Surveyor. He was obviously inspired by "Cleopatra's Needle" on the Thames Embankment in London.

References
National Heritage Board (2002), Singapore's 100 Historic Places, Archipelago Press, 
Norman Edwards, Peter Keys (1996), Singapore - A Guide to Buildings, Streets, Places, Times Books International,

External links
Virtual Reality view of Dalhousie Obelisk
Uniquely Singapore website

Buildings and structures completed in 1850
Downtown Core (Singapore)
Landmarks in Singapore
National monuments of Singapore
Obelisks in Singapore
19th-century architecture in Singapore